Diego Pélicles da Silva (23 October 1982) is a Brazilian footballer who plays for Centro Esportivo Força e Luz as a forward.

Career
Born in Natal, capital of Rio Grande do Norte state, Diego Silva started his career at hometown club América (RN). He played twice in 2003 Copa do Brasil. He finished as the runner-up of 2005 Campeonato Brasileiro Série C and promoted to Série B. He was loaned to Baraúnas in the mid way of 2006 Campeonato Brasileiro Série B in July 2006. With Baraúnas, the team failed to qualify to the next round of 2006 Campeonato Brasileiro Série C and returned to América early, in August. Which América finished as the 4th and promoted again.

In January 2007 he was loaned to Londrina for 2007 Campeonato Paranaense. In June, he was transferred to Aalesund.

Diego Silva agreed to move to Bahraini club Al-Ahli on 10 September 2010 for $120,000 making him the biggest amount paid in the history of the club.

On 31 August 2012, he signed for Swedish Allsvenskan club Åtvidabergs FF.

References

External links
 
 
 
 Diego Silva at ZeroZero

People from Natal, Rio Grande do Norte
1982 births
Living people
Brazilian footballers
Brazilian expatriate footballers
América Futebol Clube (RN) players
Londrina Esporte Clube players
Aalesunds FK players
Åtvidabergs FF players
Al-Muharraq SC players
Botafogo Futebol Clube (PB) players
Gwangju FC players
Olympic Club de Safi players
Al-Ahli Club (Manama) players
Al Hala SC players
Eliteserien players
K League 2 players
Botola players
Bahraini Premier League players
Campeonato Brasileiro Série D players
Expatriate footballers in Norway
Expatriate footballers in Bahrain
Expatriate footballers in Sweden
Expatriate footballers in Morocco
Expatriate footballers in South Korea
Brazilian expatriate sportspeople in Norway
Brazilian expatriate sportspeople in Bahrain
Brazilian expatriate sportspeople in Sweden
Brazilian expatriate sportspeople in Morocco
Brazilian expatriate sportspeople in South Korea
Association football forwards
Sportspeople from Rio Grande do Norte